The siege of Kuriyagawa was a battle during the Heian period (11th century) of Japan.

This rather minor siege, which was a part of the Zenkunen War, ended with the victory of the Minamoto. Throughout this siege, Abe commander Abe no Sadato ended up being defeated in his stockade fortress of Kuriyagawa. Minamoto no Yoshiie established Tsurugaoka Hachiman-gū within Kamakura to give thanks to his victorious Minamoto allies.

References

11th century in Japan
Kuriyagawa
1062 in Asia
Conflicts in 1062
1060s in Japan